Omps is a commune in the Cantal department in south-central France.

It comprises a collection of pleasant cottages, many with lauze roofs, surrounding the village church, but there is also an imposing Manor House. It has recently undergone improvements to the public spaces. The village's only bar closed in 2006, and with the exception of a garden centre there are no other commercial premises.

Population

See also
Communes of the Cantal department

References

Communes of Cantal